Agononida incerta is a species of squat lobster in the family Munididae. It forms a species complex with A. africerta, A. auscerta, A. indocerta, A. norfocerta, A. madagascerta, A. polycerta, A. tasmancerta, A. vanuacerta, and A. rubrizonata.

References

Squat lobsters
Crustaceans described in 1888